Willow Lawn station, located at the Shops at Willow Lawn, is a rapid transit station in Richmond, Virginia along the GRTC Pulse bus rapid transit route. It is one of two stations located in Henrico County, and serves the western terminus of the system.

The station opened on June 24, 2018. The station offers parking.

References

External links
 Willow Lawn station

Buildings and structures in Henrico County, Virginia
Buildings and structures in Richmond, Virginia
GRTC Pulse stations
2018 establishments in Virginia
Bus stations in Virginia
Transport infrastructure completed in 2018